Jennifer Maia (born October 6, 1988) is a Brazilian professional mixed martial artist. Maia currently competes in the Women's Flyweight division for the Ultimate Fighting Championship (UFC). Maia trains at  Chute Boxe Academy in Brazil.
A professional since 2009, Maia is also the former Invicta FC Flyweight World Champion. As of March 7, 2023, she is #8 in the UFC women's flyweight rankings.

Background
Maia was born in Curitiba, Paraná, Brazil, on October 6, 1988. Playing soccer since childhood, Maia transitioned to muay Thai, at the age of 15. She won several national titles in the discipline before turning to boxing and then mixed martial arts.

Boxing career
On March 29, 2008, Maia made her professional Boxing debut at Centri de Boxe in Curitiba, Brazil. She faced Michelle Bonassoli in an eight-round bout that went the distance and saw her victorious via unanimous decision.

Her second bout was against Juliana de Aguiar, another eight-round bout in which she won via points.

The last boxing match Maia competed in before transitioning into MMA was on August 5, 2009. She defeated Lorena Nancy Lopez via TKO in the fourth round.

Mixed martial arts career

Early career
Maia made her professional MMA debut on December 5, 2009. She won her first four fights, finishing each of them in the first round with three submissions and one TKO.

On October 28, 2011, Maia suffered her first loss to fellow Brazilian Vanessa Porto at Kumite MMA Combate. She was defeated by a second-round armbar.

Maia rebounded with a second-round submission victory over Tatiane Porfirio Aguiar at Pink Fight 1 on January 29, 2012.

Maia was scheduled to face Vanessa Porto in a rematch at Pink Fight 2, but she withdrew from the fight in order to compete in the Cage Warriors women's flyweight title tournament.

At Cage Warriors Fight Night 4 on March 16, 2012, Maia suffered a somewhat controversial knockout loss to future UFC fighter Sheila Gaff. At the start of the fight, when both fighters met in the center of the cage to touch gloves, Gaff unloaded a flurry of punches that knocked Maia out in just 10 seconds.

Maia next faced future UFC Women's Strawweight Championship Jéssica Andrade on December 15, 2012 at Samurai FC 9: Water vs. Fire. She won the fight via unanimous decision.

Invicta Fighting Championships
Maia made her Invicta Fighting Championships debut at Invicta FC 5: Penne vs. Waterson on April 5, 2013 against former Bellator Women's Strawweight Champion Zoila Frausto Gurgel. She won the fight via unanimous decision.

Maia then faced off against Leslie Smith in a #1 contender's fight for a shot at the Flyweight Championship held by Barb Honchak at Invicta FC 6: Coenen vs. Cyborg on July 13, 2013. She lost the fight via unanimous decision.

After returning from the regional scene in Brazil, in which she went 2–0, Maia next faced DeAnna Bennett on December 5, 2014 at Invicta FC 10: Waterson vs. Tiburcio. She lost the fight via unanimous decision.

Invicta FC Flyweight Champion
Following the loss, Maia once again returned to the regional scene in Brazil, going 3–0 before returning to Invicta. She next faced Vanessa Porto on March 11, 2016 at Invicta FC 16: Hamasaki vs. Brown for the interim Invicta FC Flyweight Championship in a rematch of their 2011 bout. She won the fight via unanimous decision to capture the title.

Due to long-time Invicta FC Flyweight Champion Barb Honchak still unable to compete in a title unification bout, Maia was scheduled to face Roxanne Modafferi in a defense of her interim title on September 23, 2016 at Invicta FC 19: Maia vs. Modafferi. However, during the official weigh-in, it was announced that Barb Honchak was stripped of her title and that Maia would now be defending her undisputed championship at the event. Maia successfully defended her title, winning the fight via split decision.

Maia's next title defense came against undefeated Agnieszka Niedźwiedź on December 8, 2017 at Invicta FC 26: Maia vs. Niedzwiedz. She won the fight via unanimous decision, successfully defending her title for the second time.

On July 7, 2018, Maia vacated her Invicta FC Flyweight Championship.

Ultimate Fighting Championship
Maia was signed with the Ultimate Fighting Championship in 2018.

Maia made her UFC debut against Liz Carmouche at UFC Fight Night 133 on July 14, 2018. Maia lost the fight by unanimous decision.

It was announced by USADA on January 15, 2019, that Maia had tested positive during an out-of-competition drug test for multiple banned substances, which they determined were ingested through tainted supplements. As a result, she was suspended six months retroactive to August 16, 2018.

Maia faced Alexis Davis on March 23, 2019 at UFC Fight Night 148. She won the fight via unanimous decision.

Maia faced Roxanne Modafferi on July 20, 2019 at UFC on ESPN 4 in a rematch of their 2016 Invicta FC Flyweight Championship bout, which Maia won via split decision. At the weigh-ins, Maia weighed in at 129 pounds, 3 pounds over the women's flyweight non-title fight limit of 126. As a result, she was fined 30 percent of her purse, and the bout proceeded a catchweight fight. Maia won the fight via unanimous decision.

As the first fight of her new six-fight contract with the UFC, Maia faced Katlyn Chookagian on November 2, 2019 at UFC 244. At the weigh-ins, Maia weighed in at 127.2 pounds, 1.2 pounds over the flyweight non-title fight limit of 126. The bout went ahead at catchweight and Maia was fined 25% of her purse and went to her opponent. Maia lost the fight via unanimous decision.

Maia was scheduled to meet Viviane Araújo on June 27, 2020 at UFC on ESPN: Poirier vs. Hooker. However, the bout was rescheduled in mid-June to take place on August 1, 2020 at UFC Fight Night: Brunson vs. Shahbazyan, after both participants faced travel restrictions related to the COVID-19 pandemic. Subsequently, Araújo was removed from the card in mid-July, after testing positive for COVID-19, and she was replaced by Joanne Calderwood. Maia won the fight via armbar submission in round one. This win earned her the Performance of the Night award.

UFC Flyweight title shot
Maia faced Valentina Shevchenko for the UFC Women's Flyweight Championship on November 21, 2020 at UFC 255. She lost the fight via unanimous decision.

Maia faced Jessica Eye on July 10, 2021 at UFC 264. She won the fight via unanimous decision.

Maia faced Katlyn Chookagian in a rematch on January 15, 2022 at UFC on ESPN 32.  She lost the fight via unanimous decision.

As the first bout of her new four-fight contract, Maia faced Manon Fiorot on March 26, 2022 at UFC on ESPN 33. She lost the fight by unanimous decision.

Maia faced Maryna Moroz on November 19, 2022, at UFC Fight Night 214. Maia won the fight via unanimous decision.

Maia faced Casey O'Neill on March 18, 2023, at UFC 286. She won the fight via unanimous decision.

Championships and accomplishments
Ultimate Fighting Championship
Performance of the Night (One times) 
Invicta Fighting Championships
Invicta FC Flyweight World Championship (One time; former)
Two successful title defenses
Interim Invicta FC Flyweight World Championship (One time; former)
Fight of the Night (Two times) vs. Vanessa Porto and Roxanne Modafferi
Performance of the Night (One time) vs. Agnieszka Niedźwiedź

Mixed martial arts record

|-
|Win
|align=center|21–9–1
|Casey O'Neill
|Decision (unanimous)
|UFC 286
|
|align=center|3
|align=center|5:00
|London, England
|
|-
|Win
|align=center|20–9–1
|Maryna Moroz
|Decision (unanimous)
|UFC Fight Night: Nzechukwu vs. Cuțelaba
|
|align=center|3
|align=center|5:00
||Las Vegas, Nevada, United States
|
|-
|Loss
|align=center|19–9–1
|Manon Fiorot
|Decision (unanimous)
|UFC on ESPN: Blaydes vs. Daukaus
|
|align=center|3
|align=center|5:00
|Columbus, Ohio, United States
|
|-
|Loss
|align=center|19–8–1
|Katlyn Chookagian
|Decision (unanimous)
|UFC on ESPN: Kattar vs. Chikadze
|
|align=center|3
|align=center|5:00
|Las Vegas, Nevada, United States
|
|-
|Win
|align=center|19–7–1
|Jessica Eye
|Decision (unanimous)
|UFC 264
|
|align=center|3
|align=center|5:00
|Las Vegas, Nevada, United States
|
|-
|Loss
|align=center|18–7–1
|Valentina Shevchenko 
|Decision (unanimous)
|UFC 255
|
|align=center|5
|align=center|5:00
|Las Vegas, Nevada, United States
|
|-
|Win
|align=center|18–6–1
|Joanne Calderwood
|Submission (armbar)
|UFC Fight Night: Brunson vs. Shahbazyan
|
|align=center|1
|align=center|4:29
|Las Vegas, Nevada, United States
|
|-
|Loss
|align=center|17–6–1
|Katlyn Chookagian
|Decision (unanimous)
|UFC 244 
|
|align=center|3
|align=center|5:00
|New York City, New York, United States
|
|-
|Win
|align=center| 17–5–1
|Roxanne Modafferi
|Decision (unanimous)
|UFC on ESPN: dos Anjos vs. Edwards 
|
|align=center|3
|align=center|5:00
|San Antonio, Texas, United States
|
|-
|Win
|align=center| 16–5–1
|Alexis Davis
| Decision (unanimous)
|UFC Fight Night: Thompson vs. Pettis 
|
|align=center|3
|align=center|5:00
|Nashville, Tennessee, United States
|
|-
|Loss
|align=center| 15–5–1
|Liz Carmouche
| Decision (unanimous)
|UFC Fight Night: dos Santos vs. Ivanov 
|
|align=center|3
|align=center|5:00
|Boise, Idaho, United States
|
|-
| Win
|align=center| 15–4–1
| Agnieszka Niedźwiedź
| Decision (unanimous)
| Invicta FC 26: Maia vs. Niedzwiedz
| 
|align=center|5
|align=center|5:00
| Kansas City, Missouri, United States
|
|-
| Win
|align=center| 14–4–1
| Roxanne Modafferi
| Decision (split)
| Invicta FC 19: Maia vs. Modafferi
| 
|align=center|5
|align=center|5:00
| Kansas City, Missouri, United States
|
|-
| Win
|align=center| 13–4–1
| Vanessa Porto
| Decision (unanimous)
| Invicta FC 16: Hamasaki vs. Brown
| 
|align=center|5
|align=center|5:00
| Las Vegas, Nevada, United States
|
|-
| Win
|align=center| 12–4–1
| Dayana Silva
| Decision (majority)
|Imortal FC 2: Kamikaze
| 
|align=center|3
|align=center|5:00
| São José dos Pinhais, Brazil
|
|-
| Win
|align=center| 11–4–1
| Marta Souza
| TKO (punches)
|Samurai FC 12: Hearts on Fire
| 
|align=center|1
|align=center|2:51
| Curitiba, Brazil
|
|-
| Win
|align=center| 10–4–1
| Stephanie Bragayrac
| KO (knee)
|Imortal FC 1: The Invasion
| 
|align=center|2
|align=center|2:07
| São José dos Pinhais, Brazil
|
|-
| Loss
|align=center| 9–4–1
| DeAnna Bennett
| Decision (unanimous)
| Invicta FC 10: Waterson vs. Tiburcio
| 
|align=center|3
|align=center|5:00
| Houston, Texas, United States
|
|-
| Win
|align=center| 9–3–1
| Elaine Albuquerque
| Decision (unanimous)
| Talent MMA Circuit 11
| 
|align=center|3
|align=center|5:00
| São José dos Pinhais, Brazil
|
|-
| Win
|align=center| 8–3–1
| Mariana Morais
| Submission (rear-naked choke)
| Talent MMA Circuit 9
| 
|align=center|2
|align=center|2:18
| São José dos Pinhais, Brazil
| 
|-
| Loss
|align=center| 7–3–1
| Leslie Smith
| Decision (unanimous)
| Invicta FC 6: Coenen vs. Cyborg
| 
|align=center|3
|align=center|5:00
| Kansas City, Missouri, United States
| 
|-
| Win
|align=center| 7–2–1
| Zoila Frausto
| Decision (unanimous)
| Invicta FC 5: Penne vs. Waterson
| 
|align=center|3
|align=center|5:00
| Kansas City, Missouri, United States
| 
|-
| Win
|align=center| 6–2–1
| Jéssica Andrade
| Decision (unanimous)
| Samurai FC 9: Water vs. Fire
| 
|align=center|3
|align=center|5:00
| Curitiba, Brazil
|
|-
| Loss
|align=center| 5–2–1
| Sheila Gaff
| KO (punches)
| Cage Warriors Fight Night 4
| 
|align=center|1
|align=center|0:10
| Dubai, United Arab Emirates
| 
|-
| Win
|align=center| 5–1–1
| Tatiane Porfirio Aguiar
| Submission (armbar)
| Pink Fight 1
| 
|align=center|2
|align=center|1:17
| Porto Seguro, Brazil
|
|-
| Loss
|align=center| 4–1–1
| Vanessa Porto
| Technical Submission (armbar)
| Kumite MMA Combate
| 
|align=center|2
|align=center|3:55
| Porto Alegre, Brazil
|
|-
| Draw
|align=center| 4–0–1
| Kalindra Faria
| Draw
| Power Fight Extreme 4
| 
|align=center|3
|align=center|5:00
| Curitiba, Brazil
|
|-
| Win
|align=center| 4–0 
| Alessandra Silva
| Submission (armbar)
| Gladiators Fighting Championship 2
| 
|align=center|1
|align=center|1:50
| Curitiba, Brazil
|
|-
| Win
|align=center| 3–0 
| Jenifer Haas
| Submission (punches)
| Challenge Mixed Martial Arts
| 
|align=center|1
|align=center|1:18
| Curitiba, Brazil
|
|-
| Win
|align=center| 2–0 
| Alessandra Silva
| Submission (rear-naked choke)
| Power Fight Extreme 2
| 
|align=center|1
|align=center|4:03
| Curitiba, Brazil
|
|-
| Win
|align=center| 1–0 
| Suelen Pinheiro Ribeiro
| TKO (punches)
| Brave FC 4: Explosion
| 
|align=center|1
|align=center|2:01
| Curitiba, Brazil
|

Professional boxing record

See also
 List of female boxers
 List of female kickboxers
 List of current UFC fighters
 List of female mixed martial artists

References

External links

 
 

1988 births
Brazilian female mixed martial artists
Flyweight mixed martial artists
Mixed martial artists utilizing boxing
Mixed martial artists utilizing Muay Thai
Mixed martial artists utilizing Brazilian jiu-jitsu
Sportspeople from Curitiba
Living people
Ultimate Fighting Championship female fighters
Brazilian practitioners of Brazilian jiu-jitsu
People awarded a black belt in Brazilian jiu-jitsu
Female Brazilian jiu-jitsu practitioners
Brazilian Muay Thai practitioners
Female Muay Thai practitioners
Brazilian women boxers
20th-century Brazilian women
21st-century Brazilian women